This is a list of countries by natural gas imports  mostly based on The World Factbook  and EIA . For informational purposes several non-sovereign entities are also included in this list.

Many countries are both importers and exporters of natural gas. For instance, although Canada appears on the list below as the world's fourteenth-largest gas importer, It exports more natural gas than it imports, and so is a net exporter of natural gas. See: List of countries by natural gas exports.

References

Energy-related lists by country
 Imports
Lists of countries
Import
International trade-related lists